Jin Taiyan (born 21 August 1989) is a Chinese footballer who last played for Beijing Guoan in the Chinese Super League.

Club career
Jin Taiyan started his football career in 2009 when he was loaned out to Liaoning Whowin's satellite team Panjin Mengzun for the 2009 league season. He was promoted to the club's first team in December 2009. He scored his first goal for the club on 31 March 2012 in a 1–1 away draw against Dalian Aerbin. Jin earned a predominantly starting role for the club for the entire 2013 season as he cemented his place in the first team.

On 29 January 2017, Jin moved to fellow Super League side Beijing Guoan. He would make his competitive debut on 15 April 2017 against Shandong Luneng in a 1–0 defeat where he came on as a substitute for Zhang Chiming. Under the Head coach José González, Jin would be a regular in the team until a string of disappointing results saw José González relieved of his duties. The following season saw the Head coach Roger Schmidt convert Jin into a full-back in a league game against Shanghai SIPG F.C. on 5 May 2018, which Beijing won 2–1. Used as versatile player throughout the season he would help the club go on the win the 2018 Chinese FA Cup against Shandong Luneng. He left Guoan at the end of the 2022 Chinese Super League season when his contracted finished.

Career statistics 
Statistics accurate as of match played 26 February 2023.

Honours

Club
Beijing Guoan
Chinese FA Cup: 2018.

References

External links
 

1989 births
Living people
Chinese footballers
Footballers from Jilin
People from Yanbian
Liaoning F.C. players
Beijing Guoan F.C. players
Association football midfielders
Chinese people of Korean descent
Chinese Super League players